Tamar Kvelidze is a Georgian footballer who plays as a defender. She has played for Norchi Dinamoeli and Baia Zugdidi in the Georgian Championship for Slovenian champion Krka Novo Mesto in the 2011–12 Champions League, and for Karlsruher SC.

She is a member of the Georgia national team.

References

External links
 

Living people
1990 births
Women's footballers from Georgia (country)
Expatriate women's footballers from Georgia (country)
Women's association football defenders
Georgia (country) women's international footballers
ŽNK Krka players
Expatriate sportspeople from Georgia (country) in Germany
Expatriate women's footballers in Germany
Expatriate sportspeople from Georgia (country) in Slovenia
Expatriate women's footballers in Slovenia